The list of people from Kansas City, Kansas includes those who were born in or have lived in the city. People from the Missouri side should not be included and should be instead listed at List of people from Kansas City, Missouri unless they've lived on both sides of the state line.

Academia
 June Helm (1924-2004), anthropologist
 John E. Hodge (1914-1996), chemist
 Bart Kosko (1960- ), engineering professor, writer
 Richard Rhodes (1937- ), historian
 Frederic Wakeman (1937-2006), historian, China scholar

Arts and entertainment

Film, television, and theater

 S. Torriano Berry (1958- ), film director
 Trai Byers (1983- ), actor
 Webster Campbell (1893-1972), actor, director, screenwriter
 Al Christy (1918-1995), actor, TV announcer
 Earl Cole (1971- ), TV show host, media personality, winner of Survivor: Fiji
 Daniel L. Fapp (1904-1986), cinematographer (West Side Story)
 Scott Foley (1972- ), actor (Scrubs, Dawson's Creek, House, and Grey's Anatomy)
 Everett McGill (1945- ), actor
 Marcy McGuire (1926- ), actress
 Cynthia Kaye McWilliams, actress (Prison Break and Marvel Heroes)
 Brendon Miller (1976- ), pornographic actor
 John Quade (1938-2009), actor
 Shanna Reed (1955- ), actress, dancer
 Rob Riggle (1970- ), actor
 Paul Rudd (1969- ), actor
 Angus Scrimm (1926-2016), actor, author
 Columbus Short (1982- ), actor
 Eric Stonestreet (1971- ), actor (Modern Family)
 Jason Sudeikis (1975- ), actor
 Terri Treas (1957- ), actress, screenwriter
 Vicki Trickett (1938- ), actress
 Matt Vogel (1970- ), puppeteer (The Muppets and Kermit the Frog)
 Lyle Waggoner (1935- ), actor, sculptor
 Dee Wallace (1948- ), actress
 Tuc Watkins (1966- ), actor (One Life to Live and Desperate Housewives)

Journalism
 Audrey Cooper (1977- ), journalist
 Bill Downs (1914-1978), broadcast journalist, war correspondent
 Mark Pittman (1957-2009), financial journalist

Literature
 Jason Aaron (1973- ), Marvel Comics writer (Thor, Ghost Rider, Wolverine, and Punisher Max)
 Julius Lester (1939- ), writer, professor, photographer

Music

 William Adam (1917-2013), trumpeter, professor
 James Bracken (1909-1972), songwriter, producer
 Ada Brown (1890-1950), singer
 Earl Carruthers (1910-1971), saxophonist
 Danny Cox (1942- ), singer-songwriter
 Dan Crary (1939- ), flatpick guitarist
 Nathan Davis (1937- ), saxophonist
 Herschel Evans (1909-1939), saxophonist
 William P. Foster (1919-2010), marching band director
 Piney Gir (1974- ), singer
 Nora Holt (1895-1974), singer, composer, critic
 Charles L. Johnson (1876-1950), ragtime composer
 Carmell Jones (1936-1996), trumpet player
 Ron Jones (1954- ), composer
 Gene McDaniels (1935-2011), singer-songwriter
 Janelle Monáe (1985- ), singer-songwriter, composer, actress ("We Are Young" and Hidden Figures)
 Charlie Parker (1920-1955), jazz saxophonist and composer
 James Scott (1885-1938), ragtime composer
 Vigalantee, rapper and activist
 Jack Washington (1910-1964), saxophonist
 Bobby Watson (1953- ), saxophonist
 J. White Did It (1984- ), record producer
 Marva Whitney (1944-2012), singer

Other visual arts
 Grant Bond (1974- ), cartoonist, writer
 Ed Dwight (1933- ), sculptor

Business
 Paul Revere Braniff (1897-1954), airline entrepreneur
 Jack Gentry (1923-2006), engineer, manufacturing entrepreneur
 Lewis Hill (1919-1957), public radio entrepreneur
 Eldridge Lovelace (1913-2008), urban planner
 Kevin Warren Sloan (1957- ), landscape architect, urban planner and writer
 Charles E. Spahr (1913-2009), oil company executive
 Cheryl Womack (1950- ), trucking insurance executive

Crime
 Richard Hickock (1931-1965), mass murderer
 James Hogue (1959- ), con artist
 Marc Sappington (1978- ), spree killer

Medicine
 Paul Randall Harrington (1911-1980), orthopedic surgeon, designer of the Harrington Rod

Military
 William N. Alsbrook Sr. (January 31, 1916 - January 5, 1998), inventor and Tuskegee Airmen
 Roscoe Cartwright, first African American Field Artilleryman promoted to Brigadier General.
 Roy M. Davenport (1909-1987), U.S. Navy Rear Admiral
 Charles Arthur Tabberer (1915-1942), U.S. Navy Lieutenant Junior Grade, Distinguished Flying Cross recipient

Politics

National

 Monti Belot (1943- ), U.S. federal judge
 George H. Clay (1911-1995), president of the Federal Reserve Bank of Kansas City
 William Hinson Cole (1837-1886), U.S. Representative from Maryland
 Harry Darby (1895-1987), U.S. Senator from Kansas
 Ben Fernandez (1925-2000), U.S. Ambassador to Paraguay
 Fernando J. Gaitan Jr. (1948- ), U.S. federal judge
 Newell A. George (1904-1992), U.S. Representative from Kansas
 John R. Goodin (1836-1885), U.S. Representative from Kansas
 Ulysses Samuel Guyer (1868-1943), U.S. Representative from Kansas
 Edward C. Little (1858-1924), U.S. Representative from Kansas
 Arthur Johnson Mellott (1888-1957), U.S. federal judge
 Orrin Larrabee Miller (1856-1926), U.S. Representative from Kansas
 Carlos Murguia (1957- ), U.S. federal judge
 Mary H. Murguia (1960- ), U.S. federal judge
 Mason S. Peters (1844-1914), U.S. Representative from Kansas
 Errett P. Scrivner (1898-1978), U.S. Representative from Kansas
 Wint Smith (1892-1976), U.S. Representative from Kansas
 Joseph Taggart (1867-1938), U.S. Representative from Kansas
 Kathryn Hoefer Vratil (1949- ), U.S. federal judge

State

 Edward F. Arn (1906-1998), 32nd Governor of Kansas
 Carol A. Beier (1958- ), Kansas Supreme Court justice
 Tom Burroughs (1954- ), Kansas state legislator
 James H. DeCoursey, Jr. (1932- ), 36th Lieutenant Governor of Kansas
 David Haley (1958- ), Kansas state legislator
 Broderick Henderson (1957- ), Kansas state legislator
 Wilkins P. Horton (1889-1950), Lieutenant Governor of North Carolina
 Phill Kline (1959- ), Kansas state legislator, former Attorney General of Kansas
 Mark Martin (1968- ), Arkansas state legislator, Secretary of State of Arkansas
 Joseph Pierron (1947- ), Kansas Court of Appeals judge 
 Mary Rogeness (1941- ), Massachusetts state legislator
 Robert Eldridge Seiler (1912-1998), Missouri Supreme Court chief justice
 Chris Steineger (1964- ), Kansas state legislator
 John Strick (1921-2009), Kansas state legislator
 Charles Warren (1927-2019), California state legislator
 Valdenia Winn (1950- ), Kansas state legislator

Local

 Charles Dail (1909-1968), 27th Mayor of San Diego
 Theresa Sparks (1949- ), San Francisco politician

Religion
 James P. deWolfe (1896-1966), fourth bishop of the Episcopal Diocese of Long Island
 Joseph Patrick Dougherty (1905-1970), Roman Catholic clergyman

Sports

American football

 Jackie Cline (1960- ), defensive lineman
 Lyron Cobbins (1974- ), linebacker
 Maliek Collins (1995- ), defensive tackle
 Harry Colon (1969- ), cornerback, safety
 Ray Evans (1922-1999), halfback
 Eric Guliford (1969- ), wide receiver
 Floyd Harrawood (1929-2003), tackle
 Mark Haynes (1958- ), cornerback
 David Jaynes (1952- ), quarterback
 Reggie Jones (1971- ), wide receiver
 Zvonimir Kvaternik (1918-1994), guard
 Bill Olds (1951- ), running back
 Justin Swift (1975- ), tight end
 Spencer Thomas (1951- ), safety
 Steve Towle (1953- ), linebacker
 David Verser (1958- ), wide receiver

Baseball

 Neil Allen (1958- ), pitcher, pitching coach
 Joe Bowman (1910-1990), pitcher
 Gilly Campbell (1908-1973), catcher
 Jim Clark (1947- ), outfielder
 David Clyde (1955- ), pitcher
 Alan Cockrell (1962- ), outfielder, hitting coach
 Pat Collins (1896-1960), catcher
 Robert Dodd (1973- ), pitcher
 Mike Dupree (1953- ), pitcher
 Paul Edmondson (1943-1970), pitcher
 Seth Greisinger (1975- ), starting pitcher
 Sherman Jones (1935-2007), pitcher, Kansas state legislator
 Bob Kammeyer (1950- ), pitcher
 Paul Penson (1931-2006), pitcher
 John Peters (1893-1932), catcher
 Steve Renko (1944- ), pitcher
 Bullet Rogan (1893-1967), outfielder, pitcher
 Ray Sadecki (1940-2014), pitcher
 David Segui (1966- ), 1st baseman
 Kite Thomas (1923-1995), outfielder
 Cotton Tierney (1894-1953), 2nd baseman
 Leo Wells (1917-2006), shortstop, 3rd baseman
 Jimmy Whelan (1890-1929), pinch hitter

Basketball

 Lucius Allen (1947- ), point guard
 Nate Bowie (1986- ), point guard
 Larry Comley (1939-2006), guard
 Larry Drew (1958- ), guard
 Rich Dumas (1945- ), guard
 Ron Franz (1945- ), small forward
 Paul Graham (1951- ), coach
 Leonard Gray (1951-2006), power forward
 Harold Hunter (1926-2013), coach
 Warren Jabali (1946-2012), point guard, shooting guard
 Leo Lyons (1987- ), power forward
 John McLendon (1915-1999), coach
 Pierre Russell (1949-1995), shooting guard
 Jackie Stiles (1978- ), shooting guard
 Earl Watson (1979- ), point guard and NBA coach
 Bus Whitehead (1928-2010), center, power forward

Golf
 Bruce Lietzke (1951-2018), golfer
 Jug McSpaden (1908-1996), golfer

Pro wrestling
 Bob Orton (1929-2006), pro wrestler
 Bob Orton, Jr. (1950- ), pro wrestler

Racing
 Jennifer Jo Cobb (1973- ), race car driver
 Jeff Emig (1970- ), motocross racer
 Eddie Hearne (1887-1955), race car driver
 Billy Winn (1905-1938), race car driver

Track and field
 Maurice Greene (1974- ), U.S. Olympic track and field athlete
 Cliff Wiley (1955- ), track and field athlete

Other
 Bryan Goebel (1961- ), pro bowler
 LeBaron Hollimon (1969- ), soccer forward
 Nick Plott (1983- ), eSports commentator
 Matt Stutzman (1982- ), archer
 Kelvin Tiller (1990- ), mixed martial artist

See also
 Lists of people from Kansas

References

Kansas City, Kansas
Kansas City